Charles Stephen "Steve" Jameson (born May 6, 1973) is a United States painter and children's book illustrator. Jameson paints under two brush names: "Cedar" and "Wodin".

Books illustrated by Jameson include Just Imagine, God Brother, Dreaming of the Beloved, and Cooking with Katie.

In 2009, Jameson was elected into the National Watercolor Society.

Early life

Steve Jameson was born in 1973 at Fort Knox, Kentucky, United States, and grew up in nearby Elizabethtown; he was the oldest of seven children of parents Hugh Jameson and Mary Jo Jameson.

Steve first went to a private, Catholic school, St. James Elementary and later attended Elizabethtown Catholic High School, both of Saint James Parish in Elizabethtown, Kentucky. He also attended Elizabethtown High School, where he graduated. Following high school, he studied at the University of Kentucky, Lexington. He majored in architecture and fine art.

At the age of 22, Steve first heard of the Indian spiritual master, Avatar Meher Baba, and after having, internal spiritual experiences while visiting Meher Spiritual Center in Myrtle Beach, South Carolina, Steve came to accept Meher Baba as the God incarnate soul known as the Avatar; the reincarnation of Zoroaster, Rama, Krishna, Buddha, Jesus and Mohammed. This story is told on the website Meher Baba Travels.

His life in Myrtle Beach

At the age of 29, Steve moved to live near the Meher Spiritual Center in Myrtle Beach, South Carolina where many disciples of Meher Baba make their homes. He opened a sign shop called The Sign Man, making custom, sandblasted, illustrated & gilded residential signs for tourists to make a living for himself. He uses his sign shop as his painting studio.  His shop/studio was featured in a two-page, illustrated spread of Grand Strand Magazine's August/September, 2014 issue.

Jameson, under the painting name of "Wodin" has become one of the best known painters of the image of Avatar Meher Baba in the world. Hundreds of his paintings are in private collections all over the world. As such, Jameson is listed as one of the best known painters of Meher Baba's image on the web site Meher Baba Travels.

Steve has visited Meher Baba's Samadhi (tomb shrine) in Ahmednagar, India three times. On these pilgrimages, he met the last remaining disciples of Meher Baba, including Baba's younger sister, Mani Irani. He became very close friends with Mani and illustrated two of her books; one of her childhood stores of life with her God-brother and another of her dreams of her God-realized brother. The first book Steve illustrated for Mani was "God Brother", published by Sheriar Books in 1993.  The second book he illustrated for her was "Dreaming of the Beloved", published by Sheriar Books in 1998.

Jameson's greatest project has been the designing of his planned, future Daddy God Art Museum to be built on the South Carolina coast among other popular tourist destinations and near the Meher Spiritual Center of Myrtle Beach.

Fine art career

The Daddy God art series
Jameson first received public recognition for a series of artworks entitled DADDY GOD.  These images of a spiritual figure are based on the physical form of Avatar Meher Baba. Jameson is widely recognized among the followers of Meher Baba to be one of the most popular, prolific and well-known painters of the physical form of Avatar Meher Baba. He has been selected as the illustrator-of-choice by several of Meher Baba's closest Mandali (spiritual disciples); including Meher Baba's sister Mani Irani and Katie Irani.  He first illustrated God Brother (1994), a children's book by Mani Irani, sister of the Indian spiritual master Avatar Meher Baba.  Later, Mani Irani again chose him to illustrate her last published book, Dreaming of the Beloved (1998), by Mani Irani. He won the Printing Industry of the Carolinas (PICA)'s First Place for a 4-color book illustration.  Fellow disciple of Meher Baba, Katie Irani then selected Jameson to illustrate her book of anecdotes & recipes calledCooking with Katie (2003), by Katie Irani.

Videography

In 1996, Steve produced a set of animated videos entitled LIFE IS A PAIR O'DUCKS. Sixteen short stories written by Jameson are accompanied by sound effects, Hollywood music writer Kris Kraft's musical score, voice overs by actresses such as Jane Barry Haynes and Mani Irani, sister of Avatar Meher Baba; with videography by Emmy award-winning television producer Chris Riger. Riger also created the documentary films 'Meher Baba's Call, The Ancient One and others about the life of Avatar Meher Baba.

In 2010, guitarist and song composer Mischa Rutenberg used Jameson's artwork from his series DADDY GOD in his music videos THIS IS NOTHING BUT YOUR LOVE and KINDNESS.

Illustrated books
 God Brother (1994), a children's book by Mani Irani, sister of the Indian spiritual master Avatar Meher Baba.
 Dreaming of the Beloved (1998), by Mani Irani. He won the Printing Industry of the Carolinas (PICA)'s First Place for a 4-color book illustration.Cooking with Katie (2003), by Katie Irani.Just Imagine (2006), a children's book.  The book included his first works as part of In God's Hands.  The book won the "Seal of Excellence Award" from Creative Child Magazine in 2007.

Album covers
 CD cover art for No Strings Attached by Judith Shotwell.
  CD cover art for The Only Real Thing by Bobbi Bernstein.
  CD cover art for Love Is All That Matters Now by Mischa Rutenberg.

The In God's Hands art series

In 2006, Jameson began In God'S Hands, illustrations for the book Just Imagine that portray children playing in the hands of God.

"Cedar" landscapes
Jameson's brush name when painting landscapes is CEDAR.

He studied with watercolorist Jeanne Dobie, AWS, NWS, who is the author of Making Color Sing. He has won several national level-awards and honors. In 2009, Jameson was elected to be a member of the National Watercolour Society.

In 2007, Jameson began painting landscapes in acrylic and oil palette knife as well as watercolor.

Published reviews and nterviews

Radio broadcasts
 Interview with Andrea R. Garrison of Blog Talk Radio for his illustrated book JUST IMAGINE

Newspapers and magazines
  Jameson was the featured "Artist of the Month" in a two-page, illustrated spread of Grand Strand Magazine's August/September, 2014 issue.
  Steve Jameson's landscape paintings of the South Carolina coast under his painting name of "Cedar" are reviewed in the online, regional magazine "Grand Strand Happening" in an article entitled "Artists of the Grand Strand".
  Jameson's painting KITTY CAT TEA PARTY is reviewed in the fall 2002 mailing of the Sheriar Foundation Report.
 The Glow magazine review of Jamesons' book DREAMING OF THE BELOVED by Mani Irani; using his painting name of WODIN.
 The White Horse Journal review for the world premier release of his animated art video LIFE IS A PAIR O'DUCKS: March 1996, volume 2.3
 The Love Street Lamp Post review of is world premier release of his animated art video LIFE IS A PAIR O'DUCKS: June 1996, volume 8.2
 The Love Street Lamp Post review of his illustrated book: GOD BROTHER:
 The Love Street Lamp Post review of his illustrated book: DREAMING OF THE BELOVED
 The Sun News cover page review (dated Friday, August 28, 1998) of his Best of Show painting award at the 1997 Waccamaw Arts Guild Show
 A review of Jameson's illustrations for GOD BROTHER in the OMPOINT CIRCULAR issue 1.

Slideshow presentations
 Slideshow of his Cedar Landscape Paintings:
 Slideshow of his Daddy God Series Paintings:
 Slideshow of his Cedar Myrtle Beach, South Carolina Landscape Paintings:
 Slideshow of his Cedar Key West & Florida Kyes Landscape Paintings:

Television series
 Television series pilot episode 1 of "The Artist"
 Television series pilot episode 2 of "The Artist"

Online reviews
  MIDWEST BOOK REVIEW volume 17, number 5 reviews JUST IMAGINE; illustrated by Jameson under his name of WODIN.
  Interview of Jameson, under the painting name of Wodin, by editors at Illumination Arts, for his illustrations in the book JUST IMAGINE.
  Illustrations by Jameson for the book GOD BROTHER, under the name of Wodin, are reviewed by Sheriar Books.
  Illustrations by Jameson for the book DREAMING OF THE BELOVED, under the name of Wodin, are reviewed by Sheriar Books.
  Review of Jameson's line of artwork entitled DADDY GOD by the editor of TRUSTMEHER, an online directory to all things relating to the spiritual master, Meher Baba.
  Jameson is listed in the online ABC directory
  Jameson (as Wodin) is mentioned on the web site by GNOSTIC LIBERATION FRONT regarding books and artwork about Meher Baba.
  Jameson (as Wodin) is mentioned on the web site THE AVATAR'S CALL as an illustrator of images of Meher Baba, spiritual master.
  Illustrations by Jameson (as Wodin) for two books GOD BROTHER and DREAMING OF THE BELOVED are reviewed by THE MEHER BABA ASSOCIATION in their list of books about Meher Baba.
  Jameson's artwork under his painting name of Wodin is reviewed in the wikiblog about Meher Baba.
  Jameson's artwork under his painting name of Wodin is reviewed in an online article by book editor Kendra Crossen Burroughs entitled LOOKING AT MEHER BABA dated May 5, 2007.
  Two of Jameson's illustrated books, GOD BROTHER and DREAMING OF THE BELOVED are reviewed online by Meher Rose.
  Jameson is listed in the YAHOO DIRECTORY OF ARTISTS.
  Jameson's artwork is mentioned on the German web site MEHER BABA LENKER KILDEN as suitable art for children to collect.
  Jameson's illustrations and cover art for COOKING WITH KATIE, a book by Meher Baba's cook and mandali member Katie Irani, are pictured and reviewed by Sheriar Books Online.
  Online review by Cherie Plumplee on her web site MEHER BABA ART CARDS.
  Jameson's illustrations and cover art for GOD BROTHER by Mani Irani were reviewed online by FILED BY.
  Jameson's painting name WODIN and why Jameson chose that name is discussed in an IRON TRYBE article.
  Atpedia online review of Jameson's work under the name WODIN.
  Online reviews of Jameson's art under the name WODIN can be seen at GALAXY.
  Online interview by Illumination Arts Publishing in 2009.
  Online review of his book Just Imagine by Beverly J. Rowe on her website MyShelf.

Television broadcasts
 Southern Style'' television program broadcast by Time Warner Cable of South Carolina.  February 20, 2007 Interview by Diane DeVaughn Stokes for his illustrated book JUST IMAGINE and new line of art entitled IN GOD'S HANDS.

Awards and exhibits

Awards
  2008 – Awarded National Watercolor Society Signature Membership Status
  2007 – Seal Of Excellence – Creative Child Magazine–for "Just Imagine", Illus. book
  2001 – First Place – Boulder, CO Art Association
  2001 – Merit Award – Society of Watercolor Artists Annual National Exhibition
  2001 – Award of Merit – Plano, TX Watercolor Association
  2001 – Merit Award – Louisiana Watercolor Society Annual National Juried Exhibition
  2001 – Award of Merit – Az Aqueous Annual National Juried Exhibition; Don Andrews, AWS, NWS, Juror
  2001 – Award of Excell. – Ga Watercolor Society Annual National Juried Exhibition; Pat Dews, NWS, AWS, Juror
  2001 – Patron Award – Santa Fe Trail International Art Exhibition, Trinidad, CO
  2001 – Honorable Mention Award – Santa Fe Trail International Art Exhibit, Trinidad, CO
  2000 – First Place – Southport, NC Annual National Juried Show – Juror: Don Getz
  2000 – First Place – Arizona Watercolor Association, Fall Show
  2000 – Third Place – Laredo, TX Center for the Arts Annual International Show
  2000 – Second Place – Brand XXX Annual National Juried Exhibition, Glendale, CA
  1999 – First Place – 4 color pub. for book illustration – PICA (Printing Industry of Carolinas)
  1998 – Second Place – Waccamaw Arts Guild Annual Show
  1997 – Best of Show – Waccamaw Arts Guild Annual Show
  1996 – Honorable Mention – Waccamaw Arts Guild Annual Show

Exhibits
  2015 – Solo Exhibition entitled "Ode To The Grand Strand" at the Franklin G. Burroughs, Simeon B. Chapin Art Museum of Myrtle Beach, Myrtle Beach, South Carolina from May 26 through September 15, 2015.
  2010 – National Watercolor Society 90th Annual Jurried Exhibition
  2008 – National Watercolor Society 88th Annual Juried Exhibition
  2005 – North East Watercolor Society National Juried Watercolor Exhibition
  2005 – Arizona Watercolor Association National Juried Watercolor Exhibition
  2005 – Charleston, SC Annual Piccolo Spoleto Festival Juried Art Exhibition
  2005 – Pittsburgh Watercolor Society Annual National Exhibition
  2005 – Northwest Watercolor Society Annual Open Exhibition
  2002 – Texas Watercolor Society Annual National Exhibition
  2002 – Georgia Watercolor Society Annual National Exhibition
  2001 – Academic Artist Association of Connecticut Annual Exhibition
  2001 – Harrisburg, PA Art Association Annual Exhibition
  2001 – Sacramento, CA Fine Arts Cntr Ann'l Internat'l "Magnum Opus" Exbt.
  2001 – Santa Fe Trail International Art Show
  2001 – Pennsylvania Watercolor Society Annual National Exhibition
  2001 – Taos National Exhibition of American Watercolor
  2001 – Missouri Watercolor Society Annual National Exhibition
  2001 – Associated Artists of Southport, NC Annual National Juried Exhibition
  2001 – Academic Artists Association of Connecticut Annual National Juried Show
  2001 – Boulder Art Association Annual National Juried Exhibition
  2001 – Hilton Head, SC Art League Annual National Juried Exhibition
  2001 – Fort Worth, TX Watercolor Society Annual National Juried Exhibition
  2001 – Plano, TX Art League Annual National Juried Exhibition
  2001 – Watercolor Society of Houston, TX Annual National Juried Exhibition
  2001 – Missouri Watercolor Society Annual National Juried Exhibition
  2001 – Merriam, KS Annual National Juried Exhibition
  2001 – Washt'n and Jeff'n Coll., Washington, PA Annual National Juried Exhibition
  2001 – Louisiana Watercolor Society Annual National Juried Exhibition
  2001 – Georgia Watercolor Society Annual National Juried Exhibition
  2001 – Baker Arts Center, Liberal, KS National Juried Show
  2000 – Salmagundi Club, Manhattan, NY National Juried Exhibition
  2000 – North East Watercolor Society National Annual Juried Exhibition
  2000 – Rhode Island Watercolor Society Annual Juried Show
  2000 – Western Colorado Watercolor Society Annual Juried Exhibit
  2000 – Kentucky Watercolor Society Annual Juried Show
  2000 – Louisville, Colorado Art Association Annual Juried Show
  2000 – Arizona Watercolor Association Annual Show
  2000 – Arizona Watercolor Association Traveling Exhibit
  2000 – Colonie Art League Annual Show
  2000 – Sacramento Fine Arts Center Annual Show
  2000 – South Carolina Watercolor Society Annual Show
  2000 – Southport, NC Annual Art Show
  2000 – Charleston, SC Annual Spoletto Arts Show
  2000 – Moja Arts Festival, City of Charleston, SC Annual Juried Show
  2000 – Brand XXX Annual National Juried Exhibition, Glendale, CA
  2000 – Arizona Watercolor Association Fall Membership Exhibition
  2000 – Laredo, Texas Center for the Arts 8th Annual International Juried Show
  2000 – Period Gallery, Omaha, NE Annual International Juried Art Exhibit
  2000 – Texas Watercolor Society Annual National Exhibit
  2000 – Arizona Aqueous Annual National Water Media Exhibition
  2000 – Louisiana Art & Artists Guild Annual Juried National Exhibition
  1999 – Southern Watercolor Society Annual Show
  1999 – Texas Watercolor Society Annual Show

References

External links

 Saint James Parish
 Sheriar Non-Profit Books
 Illumination Arts Charity Books
 Cedar: Landscape Art 
 Wodin: Daddy God Art Series 
 Wodin: In God's Hands Art Series

1953 births
20th-century American painters
American male painters
21st-century American painters
21st-century male artists
Followers of Meher Baba
Living people
People from Myrtle Beach, South Carolina
People from Elizabethtown, Kentucky
American watercolorists
University of Kentucky alumni